The Centre for the Moving Image (CMI) is a registered charity comprising Edinburgh International Film Festival, Edinburgh Filmhouse and, since April 2014, the Belmont Filmhouse, Aberdeen.

Its stated aim is to "provide a national focus for curatorial, research and educational resources for the film industry and public in Scotland and the UK".

On 6 October 2022 the CMI went into administration, with immediate closure of its operations while seeking buyers for its assets.

References

External links

Charities based in Edinburgh
Cinema of Scotland
Film organisations in the United Kingdom
Culture in Edinburgh